Mest is an American rock band originally formed by lead vocalist and guitarist Tony Lovato, bassist Matt Lovato, drummer Nick Gigler, and guitarist Jeremiah Rangel. They broke up in 2006 after eleven years, but temporarily reformed in California in 2008 for a "final tour." Tony released “Not What You Expected” in 2013 and it was announced in 2018 that the classic lineup of Mest, with Tony Lovato, Matt Lovato, Nick Gigler, and Jeremiah Rangel, would be getting back together to track Masquerade. Tony has just finished the newest Mest record which is slated for release in spring/summer of 2023.

History
Cousins Matt Lovato and Tony Lovato formed the band together in October 1995. The band's last guitarist, Jeremiah Rangel, joined the band in 1998. Their previous guitarist was Steve Lovato, Tony Lovato's brother. Nick Gigler joined the band in 1997.

In 1998, the band self-released Mo' Money, Mo' 40z. Their debut album on Maverick Records, Wasting Time, was released in July 2000 and Destination Unknown in 2001. They toured as an opening band for Goldfinger on July 20, 2002, in Las Vegas and then a few months later, released a DVD called The Show Must Go Off! in January 2003. Later that same year, the band released their self-titled album, which featured the single Jaded (These Years), featuring Benji Madden of Good Charlotte.

In 2005, a tour with Social Distortion was cut short when drummer Nick Gigler required surgery for carpal tunnel syndrome in his wrists which was affecting his drumming. The band's last album, Photographs, was released October 18, 2005.

In January 2006, the band announced on their MySpace blog that they would break-up following a U.S. tour. The tour ran from late January until early March, with support from Allister and Scary Kids Scaring Kids.

Mest played a reunion show at the House of Blues in Anaheim, California, on April 17, 2008. In response, Nick Gigler posted a bulletin through his personal MySpace and confirmed that he would not be taking part, and that he had called Jeremiah Rangel and Matt Lovato, who had confirmed that they would not be appearing with Tony either.

After the one-off "One Night Stand" show, Tony decided to rebuild Mest and go on a monthlong tour, with help from Chris Wilson (Good Charlotte, The Summer Obsession), and his brother and founding member, Steve Lovato (at the time in Room One Eleven). Although Matt showed interest, he and Jeremiah were both reported to be too busy with other commitments to join. Nick and Tony had not been on speaking terms since the band broke up. The trek took place in October and November 2008, and featured Quietdrive, Rookie of the Year, and Automatic Loveletter.

Mest went on a European tour in spring 2012 with its current members, Mike Longworth and Richie Gonzales, and also toured the US with Escape the Fate and Attack Attack in 2012.

Mest released their album Not What You Expected in September 2013, written and recorded with Richie Gonzales and Mike Longworth, making it available for free to download from their website. Mest played 3 dates on the Warped Tour 2013. They self-released another album in 2014, entitled Broken Down.

On October 25, 2018, Mest officially announced that they had signed with El Hefe, from NOFX's label Cyber Trax Records and a new album with the original lineup would be released in spring 2019. A single entitled "Masquerade" was uploaded to YouTube in July 2019, accompanied by an announcement to the effect that a new album would be released in the fall of that year, produced by Cameron Webb.

Mest's album Masquerade was released on January 17, 2020.

Mest are rumored to be releasing a new record spring/summer of 2023.

Projects

Room One Eleven 
Steve Lovato a.k.a. "Locust", went on to assemble a music project called Room One Eleven which includes former Mest lighting engineer and merchandise salesman, Phil Cirullo a.k.a. "Swylla" and hip hop prodigy Damien Ringo. They are a group based out of Chicago's Southside. This band's first album "Tears Dry Slow" was released in early March 2008.

Kisses for Kings 
Tony Lovato went on to form a band called Kisses for Kings, whose line-up consists of Tony Lovato, Mike Longworth, and Richie Gonzales. They have performed on the 2007 Warped Tour and toured in July 2009 with Hollywood Undead, Red Jumpsuit Apparatus and The Sleeping on the "Taking Care of Business Tour" a.k.a. TCB Tour. Their first EP was released on May 1, 2010, at the MEST show at the House of Blues, Anaheim.

The Twilight and the Sound 
Matt and Jeremiah formed a new band called The Twilight and the Sound, announced publicly via Mest's MySpace page on Monday, October 27, 2008.

The Get Go 
Nick Gigler's first project after Mest was Chicago-based The Get Go. The band was formed in January 2007, and also features members such as Allister's Scott Murphy on bass and vocals and Kyle Lewis on guitar and vocals, Showoff's Chris Messer on vocals and Nate Thruman on guitar and vocals.

The A-Gang
The A-Gang is a current project involving Nick Gigler on drums. Based in Detroit, it also features former Suicide Machines bassist Rich Tschirhart.

Members 
 Current
 Tony Lovato – lead vocals, rhythm guitar (1995–present)
 Gary Foster - Drums (2020-current) 
 Casey Artus - Bass (2020-Current) 
 Matt Lovato – bass (1995–2006, 2015–2020)
 Nick Gigler – drums (1995–2006, 2015–2020)
 Jeremiah Rangel – lead guitar, backing and lead vocals (1998–2006, 2015–2020)

 Chris Wilson – drums (2008)
 Steve Lovato – bass (2008–2012)
 Richie Gonzales – drums (2010–2015)
 Mike Longworth – lead guitar, studio bass (2010–2015)
 Brandon Stewart – bass (2013–2015) 

 Timeline

Discography

Studio albums

Acoustic albums

Singles
"Drawing Board" from Wasting Time
"Cadillac" from Destination Unknown
"Mother's Prayer" from Destination Unknown
"Jaded (These Years)" from Mest – No. 88 Australia
"Take Me Away (Cried Out to Heaven)" from Photographs
"Kiss Me, Kill Me" from Photographs
"Almost" from Not What You Expected
"Radio (Something To Believe)" from Not What You Expected

Music videos

Videography appearances
 The Show Must Go Off! (2003) DVD

References

External links

Maverick Records artists
Musical groups from Chicago
Musical groups established in 1995
Musical groups disestablished in 2006
Musical groups reestablished in 2008
Pop punk groups from Illinois